Etia nguti is a species of cichlid fish endemic to Cameroon in Central Africa where it is only known from the Nguti River (Ehumbve river), a tributary of the Cross-Manyu River. It is the only member of its genus and tribe.

Etymology
The species name refers to the village Nguti in Southwestern Cameroon where the majority of the type series was collected. The generic name "Etia" in the indigenous Mbo language spoken in Nguti means "located in", 'Etia Nguti' literally means "located in Nguti."

References

Cichlidae
Freshwater fish of Cameroon
Endemic fauna of Cameroon
Monotypic fish genera
Taxa named by Ulrich K. Schliewen
Taxa named by Melanie Stiassny
Fish described in 2003